The Other Russia (Drugaya Rossiya), sometimes cited as Another Russia, was an umbrella coalition (2006–2008/2009/2010) that gathered opponents of President Vladimir Putin and was known as an organizer of Dissenters' Marches. The coalition brought together representatives from a wide variety of political and human rights movements, liberals, nationalists, socialists and communists (though the CPRF was absent), as well as individual citizens. The last Dissenters' March took place in 2008.

The group included both far left, centre, and far right opposition leaders as well as mainstream liberals such as former world chess champion and United Civil Front leader Garry Kasparov (in 2006–2007), the radical National Bolshevik Party leader Eduard Limonov, and the far-left Vanguard of Red Youth. In 2010, the coalition has been dissolved.

History
The Other Russia was formed during a constitutional meeting in July 2006, (during the G8 summit) in Moscow. Western diplomats, including British Ambassador to Russia Anthony Brenton, U.S. Assistant Secretary of State for Democracy, Human Rights, and Labor Barry Lowenkron, and U.S. Assistant Secretary of State for European and Eurasian Affairs Daniel Fried, were attending the conference. The two main liberal parties, Yabloko and the Union of Rightist Forces, were boycotting the event over the participation of what they consider to be nationalist and extremist groups.

During the summer of 2006, the society prepared a "coalition of national harmony", designed to accumulate common positions among its members. Work on several agenda items are discussed in specialized work groups. The final text was presented for a general discussion at a meeting on November 22, 2006. On September 25, 2006, The Other Russia was declared a "national forum".

On December 16, 2006, the first joint political rally took place in Moscow, named the "Dissenters' March". The name was first used by Garry Kasparov in 2005. Later, on March 3, 2007, the next "Dissenters' March" took place in Saint Petersburg, which was the largest opposition rally made in recent years in Russia.
 
A further "Dissenters' March" took place on April 14, 2007 in Moscow. Several people, including Garry Kasparov and former Prime Minister Mikhail Kasyanov, were arrested, but released some hours later. Another rally was held on April 15 in Saint Petersburg.

Key people
 Lyudmila Alexeyeva  (Moscow Helsinki Group)
 Mikhail Delyagin (Institute for Globalization Issues)
 Yuri Dzhibladze (Center for Development of Democracy and Human Rights)
 Viktor Gerashchenko (Rodina, former Chairman of the Soviet and Central Bank of Russia)
 Andrei Illarionov (Former senior economic advisor to the president)
 Garry Kasparov (United Civil Front)
 Eduard Limonov (National Bolshevik Party)
 Yelena Lukyanova (Law Professor at Moscow State University) 
 Vladimir Ryzhkov (Republican Party of Russia)
 Georgy Satarov (Information Science for Democracy - INDEM)
 Sergei Udaltsov (Vanguard of Red Youth/Left Front/Russian United Labour Front)

Former members
 Mikhail Kasyanov (Russian People's Democratic Union, former Prime Minister); due to The Other Russia failure to agree on a single presidential candidate, Kasyanov left The Other Russia in July 2007.

See also

Dissenters' March
National Bolshevism
Liberalism in Russia
Russian nationalism
Radical nationalism in Russia

References

External links

 Другая Россия - Official site
 Сайт «Марш несогласных» - March of the Discontented
 Итоговое заявление участников конференции «Другая Россия» Concluding statement by the participants, www.kasparov.ru
  Limonov vs. Putin

 
2006 establishments in Russia
2010 disestablishments in Russia